

The Avia BH-3 was a fighter plane built in Czechoslovakia in 1921. Conceptually a descendant of the BH-1 sports plane, it was a braced, low-wing monoplane of conventional configuration and tailskid undercarriage. Following favourable trials in June 1921, ten examples were ordered by the Czechoslovakian Air Force. These were delivered in 1923 under the military designation B.3. The type proved temperamental in service and was soon relegated to training duties, where it served until 1927.

Units using this aircraft
 1st Airborne Regiment, Czechoslovakian Air Force

Specifications

See also

References

 
 
 airwar.ru

Low-wing aircraft
Single-engined tractor aircraft
1920s Czechoslovakian fighter aircraft
BH-03